The Portuguese Cross Country Championships is an annual cross country running competition that serves as Portugal's national championship for the sport. It is usually held in February or March. It was first held in 1911 and featured a men's long course race only. A women's race was added to the programme in 1967. Short course races for both sexes have been held since 2000.

The event includes separate races for both sexes across four categories: open (senior), under-23, under-20, and under-18. The introduction of short races came shortly after their introduction as an official distance at the IAAF World Cross Country Championships. The under-23 races were established in 2014. The under-20 race is much longer-lived: its debut for men came in 1932 and the women's race appeared for the first time in 1971. The under-18 race for boys was created in 1966 and shortly followed by a girls race in 1972. Each of the races features both an individual and club team component. The short course races are usually held separately from the main long course events. The 2010 and 2012 races were held as part of the annual international Almond Blossom Cross Country race.

Carlos Lopes is the most successful athlete of the competition, having won ten national titles between 1970 and 1984, while Rosa Mota is the most successful woman, with eight titles between 1975 and 1985. In the short races, Rui Silva has the most titles at nine (between 2000 and 2013) and Anália Rosa has the most among women, earning five titles from 2000 to 2006.

Past senior race winners

The following year's races were won by non-Portuguese runners:
2012: Josphat Kiprono Menjo (35:40) and Gorreti Chepkoech (26:05), both of Kenya
2010: Mark Bett of Kenya in 35:22

Short race

References

List of winners
National Crosscountry Champions for Portugal. Association of Road Racing Statisticians (2016-09-13). Retrieved on 2016-09-14.

External links
Portuguese Athletics Federation website

Athletics competitions in Portugal
National cross country running competitions
Annual sporting events in Portugal
Recurring sporting events established in 1911
1911 establishments in Portugal
Cross country running in Portugal